Umesh Harijan (born 8 July 1992) is an Indian professional footballer who plays as a forward for South United F.C. in the I-League 2nd Division.

Career
Born in Goa, Harijan was a part of the SESA Football Academy. He then joined I-League club Salgaocar before the 2014–15 season. He made his debut for the club on 24 May 2015 against Bharat FC. Harijan started the match and played 68 minutes as Salgaocar won 5–1.

International
Harijan represented Goa during the 2014 Lusophony Games. He scored the opening goal for Goa in their 2–1 victory over Mozambique.

Career statistics

Honour

Goa lusophony 
2014 Lusophony Games (1)

References

1992 births
Living people
Indian footballers
Salgaocar FC players
Association football forwards
Footballers from Goa
I-League players